Ruined Heart (Tagalog: Pusong Wazak) is a 2014 Filipino crime drama film directed by Khavn.

Cast
Tadanobu Asano
Nathalia Acevedo
Elena Kazan
Paul Andre Puertollano
Vim Nadera
Khavn

Reception
Ruined Heart premiered in competition at the 27th Tokyo International Film Festival.

References

External links

2014 films
2010s Tagalog-language films
Filipino-language films
Philippine crime drama films
Films directed by Khavn